The Milwaukee Ale House is a pub and restaurant in Milwaukee, Wisconsin, U.S.A. which serves a variety of award-winning beers.  It is located between Water Street and the Milwaukee River in Milwaukee's Historic Third Ward, and was founded October 17, 1997. The brewpub brews 10 distinct styles of beer in addition to a full menu of food. It has an outdoor patio which overlooks the Milwaukee River. The pub has been described as "one of Wisconsin's most acclaimed brew pubs."
The pub features live music weekly and was recognized as the Best Music Venue by the Wisconsin Area Music Industry in 1999.

The Milwaukee Ale House opened up a second location in Grafton, Wisconsin on May 14, 2008, also located on the Milwaukee River.

The Milwaukee Ale House began to bottle and distribute its beers locally in the summer of 2008.

See also
Beer in Milwaukee

References

No RSVP Needed: Milwaukee Ale House. Milwaukee Journal Sentinel. Sept. 1, 2005

Tourism in Wisconsin
Companies based in Milwaukee
Restaurants in Milwaukee
Restaurants established in 1997
1997 establishments in Wisconsin